Mohan Ramachandra Wani (born 1965) is an Indian cell biologist, immunologist and a scientist at the National Centre for Cell Science. Known for his studies in the fields of bone and cartilage cell biology, osteoimmunology, and regenerative medicine, Wani is an elected fellow of the National Academy of Sciences, India and an elected member of Guha Research Conference. The Department of Biotechnology of the Government of India awarded him the National Bioscience Award for Career Development, one of the highest Indian science awards, for his contributions to biosciences in 2009.

Biography 

Born in 1965 in the Indian state of Maharashtra, Mohan Wani graduated in veterinary science from Nagpur Veterinary College and earned his master's degree from Dr. Panjabrao Deshmukh Krishi Vidyapeeth (PDKV). His doctoral studies were at the University of London on a Commonwealth Fellowship and after securing a PhD, he returned to India to join the National Centre for Cell Science (NCCS) of Savitribai Phule Pune University. At NCCS, he holds the position of a Grade F scientist at the Venture Center Outreach Center and is a part of the research groups on Cell Organization and Function, Pathogenesis and Cellular Response as wells as Stem Cells and Regeneration. He resides at the University Campus in Ganeshkkind, Pune in Maharashtra.

Wani's research focus is in the fields of bone and cartilage cell biology, osteoimmunology, arthritis, stem cell science and regenerative medicine. He is known to have worked extensively on recombinant mouse IL-3 and has developed mouse models of rheumatoid arthritis in humans. His studies have been documented by way of a number of articles and ResearchGate, an online repository of scientific articles has listed 50 of them. He is a member of the Task Force on Stem Cell Research and Regenerative Medicine of the Department of Biotechnology of the Government of India and has delivered guest lectures on the subject. He also serves as a member of the editorial board of the Journal of Animal Science of the Laboratory Animal Scientists' Association (India).

Awards and honors 
Wani received the B. M. Birla Science Prize of the B. M. Birla Science Centre in 2004 and the Prof B. K. Bachhawat International Travel Grant for Young Scientists of the Christian Medical College in 2006. The Department of Biotechnology (DBT) of the Government of India awarded him the National Bioscience Award for Career Development, one of the highest Indian science awards in 2009. He became an elected fellow of the National Academy of Sciences, India in 2011. He is also an elected member of Guha Research Conference.

Selected bibliography

See also 
 Interleukin 3
 Granulocyte

Notes

References

External links 
 
 

N-BIOS Prize recipients
Indian scientific authors
Living people
20th-century Indian biologists
Indian cell biologists
Indian immunologists
Stem cell researchers
Scientists from Nagpur
1965 births
Alumni of the University of London
Academic staff of Savitribai Phule Pune University